Cold Summer may refer to:

Cold Summer (U.S.D.A. album)
Cold Summer (DJ Mustard album)
"Cold Summer" (song), by Fuel
A Cold Summer, a 2003 Australian film